Throwdown or Throw Down may refer to:

Arts, entertainment, and media

Games
Animation Throwdown: The Quest For Cards, a mobile crossover card battle game released by Kongregate in 2016, involving characters, settings and episodes from five popular animated sitcoms
UFC: Throwdown, a 2002 videogame

Music
Throw Down (album), a 2013 country album by Tim Hicks
Throwdown (band), an American groove metal/metalcore band
 Throwdown, a 2014 EP by Fox Stevenson
"Hoedown Throwdown", a 2009 song performed by American recording artist Miley Cyrus, combining elements of country, dance, pop and rap
"Small Town Throwdown", a 2014 song by Brantley Gilbert
The Big Throwdown, a 1987 album by LeVent
The Throwdowns, an American reggae band
 Throwin' Down, an album Rick James, featuring the song "Throwdown"

Television
"Throwdown" (Glee), a 2009 episode of the Fox television series Glee
Throwdown Thursday, a basketball TV show
Throwdown! with Bobby Flay, a competition show on Food Network
The Great Pottery Throw Down, a ceramics competition show on BBC Channel 4

Other uses in arts, entertainment, and media
Throw Down (film), a 2004 Hong Kong action film
Throwdowns, bang snaps fireworks

Other uses
 Throw down, to fist fight or brawl
Throwdown, a gun planted as a result of police corruption
Throwdown in Motown, a 2004 NBA brawl with the Indiana Pacers and the Detroit Pistons